Roland Bezamat (26 May 1924 – 15 May 2022) was a French cyclist. He competed in the individual and team road race events at the 1952 Summer Olympics, winning a bronze medal in the latter.

References

External links
 

1924 births
2022 deaths
French male cyclists
Olympic cyclists of France
Cyclists at the 1952 Summer Olympics
Olympic bronze medalists for France
Olympic medalists in cycling
Cyclists from Paris
Medalists at the 1952 Summer Olympics